Wallaconchis is a genus of air-breathing sea slugs, a shell-less marine pulmonate gastropod mollusks in the family Onchidiidae. 

They live in the intertidal zone near mangrove trees on coral rubble, sand, sandy mud, or rocks.

Species 
According to the World Register of Marine Species (WoRMS), the following species are part of the genus Wallaconchis:

 Wallaconchis achleitneri Goulding, 2018
 Wallaconchis ater (Lesson, 1831)
 Wallaconchis buetschlii (Stantschinsky, 1907)
 Wallaconchis comendadori Goulding & Dayrat, 2018
 Wallaconchis gracilis (Stantschinsky, 1907)
 Wallaconchis graniferus (Semper, 1880)
 Wallaconchisx melanesiensis Goulding & Dayrat, 2018
 Wallaconchis nangkauriensis (Plate, 1893)
 Wallaconchis sinanui Goulding & Dayrat, 2018
 Wallaconchis uncinus Goulding & Dayrat, 2018
 Nomen dubium
 Wallaconchis fungiformis (Stantschinsky, 1907)
 Wallaconchis ovalis (C. Semper, 1880) 
 Wallaconchis simrothi (Plate, 1893) 
Species brought into synonymy
 Wallaconchis atra (Lesson, 1831): synonym of Wallaconchis ater (Lesson, 1831)
 Wallaconchis fungiforme (Stantschinsky, 1907): synonym of Wallaconchis fungiformis (Stantschinsky, 1907) (wrong gender agreement of specific epithet)
  Wallaconchis gracile (Stantschinsky, 1907): synonym of Wallaconchis gracilis (Stantschinsky, 1907) (wrong gender agreement of specific epithet)
 Wallaconchis graniferum (C. Semper, 1880): synonym of Wallaconchis graniferus (C. Semper, 1880) (wrong gender agreement of specific epithet)
 Wallaconchis nangkauriense (Plate, 1893): synonym of Wallaconchis nangkauriensis (Plate, 1893) (wrong gender agreement of specific epithet)

References

External links
 Goulding T.C., Khalil M., Tan S.H. & Dayrat B. (2018). Integrative taxonomy of a new and highly-diverse genus of onchidiid slugs from the Coral Triangle (Gastropoda, Pulmonata, Onchidiidae). ZooKeys. 763: 1-111

Onchidiidae
Gastropod genera